The reservoir north of Abbey Village on the River Roddlesworth - known as Close House Reservoir - is the latest addition to the reservoirs around this small Lancashire village, designed to increase water storage capacity in wet years.

References

Drinking water reservoirs in England
Geography of Chorley
Reservoirs in Lancashire